The Tayrona National Natural Park is a protected area in the Colombian northern Caribbean region and within the jurisdiction of the city of Santa Marta,  from the city centre. The park presents a biodiversity endemic to the area of the Sierra Nevada de Santa Marta mountain range, featuring a variety of climates (mountain climate) and geography that ranges from arid sea level to 900 meters above sea level.

It was the second most visited national park in Colombia in 2019, with 458,755 visitors.

History 
The Tayrona National Park was created by the 191st Law of the Colombian. Institute for Agrarian Reform (INCORA), in order to guarantee the protection of the region and the preservation of the ecological environment.

Geography 
It is located in the jurisdiction of the Santa Marta municipality, in the Department of Magdalena, alonged the north coast of Colombia which borders on the Caribbean Sea.

Taganga is its most southern part; its western boundary goes toward the northeast following the coastline, including a kilometer of sea area, until the Piedras River. The boundary follows the left side of the river until the North Highway, and then toward the west, crossing the following places with clear demarcations in the terrain:

 Santa Rosa Hill
 Tovar Hill
 Guacamayo Pick
 Aguas Muertas Hill
 Cielito Pick
 Hondonada Site
 Humo Hill

It also crosses several creeks, like the Piedras River, Cañaveral, Santa Rosa, La Boquita, Cinto, and other water branches, including the Rodríguez and Gairaca creeks.

Climate

Flora and fauna 
 Scholars have done an extensive classification of animal species living in the park, which include about 108 species of mammals and 300 species of birds. The Mantled howler, the oncilla, deer and more than 70 species of bats are among the park's typical residents.

The park's 300 species of birds include the montane solitary eagle, the military macaw, black-backed antshrike, white-bellied antbird and the lance-tailed manakin.  There are also approximately 31 species of reptiles, 15 species of amphibians, 202 species of sponges, 471 species of crustaceans, 96 species of annelids, 700 species of molluscs, 110 species of corals and 401 species of sea and river fish.

There are more than 350 algae and more than 770 species of plants.

It is one of three national parks in the Colombian Caribbean with coral reefs on its territories, the other two being Old Providence McBean Lagoon and Rosario and San Bernardo Corals.

Archaeology 
There is archaeological evidence of ancient human settlements in the area of the park up until the 16th century. The place now has facilities for the eco-tourism, with paths suitable for walks. The Archaeologic Museum of Chairama is located in the Cañaveral Site, near the mouth of the Piedras River. Other places which attract visitors are Los Naranjos Path,  Castilletes Beach, The Pool, the Piedras River and the San Juan Out.

The site of El Pueblito was a popular hike but is currently closed in 2019 due to the wishes of the indigenous residents.

See also 

 List of national parks of Colombia
 Taganga

References

Bibliography

External links 

 Complete Guide to Tayrona Park
 Best Pictures of Tayrona Park
 
 The park's page at Parques Nacionales Naturales de Colombia

National parks of Colombia
Protected areas established in 1969
Geography of Magdalena Department
1969 establishments in Colombia
Tourist attractions in Magdalena Department
Underwater diving sites in the Caribbean
Underwater diving sites in Colombia